Place des Cordeliers à Lyon (also known as Cordeliers' Square in Lyon) is an 1895 French short black-and-white silent documentary film directed and produced by Louis Lumière.

The film formed part of the first commercial presentation of the Lumière Cinématographe on 28 December 1895 at the Salon Indien, Grand Café, 14 Boulevard des Capuchins, Paris.

Production
This short documentary was filmed in Place des Cordeliers, Lyon, Rhône, Rhône-Alpes, France. It was filmed by means of the Cinématographe, an all-in-one camera, which also serves as a film projector and developer. As with all early Lumière movies, this film was made in a 35 mm format with an aspect ratio of 1.33:1.

Synopsis

The film has no plot as such but is instead a stationary camera positioned on the Place des Cordeliers in Lyon. The camera observes the traffic passing along the street, including people walking and a number of horses pulling carriages.

Current status
The existing footage of this film was edited into The Lumière Brothers' First Films published in 1996.

References

External links
The Lumiere Institute (requires quicktime)
 
 Place des Cordeliers à Lyon on YouTube

1895 films
French black-and-white films
Films set in Lyon
French silent short films
French short documentary films
Films directed by Auguste and Louis Lumière
1890s short documentary films
Black-and-white documentary films
1890s French films